Elymnias penanga, the pointed palmfly, is a butterfly in the family Nymphalidae. It was described by John Obadiah Westwood in 1851. It is found in the  Indomalayan realm.

Subspecies
Elymnias penanga penanga (Peninsular Malaysia, Singapore, Langkawi)
Elymnias penanga sumatrana Wallace, 1869 (Sumatra)
Elymnias penanga konga Grose-Smith, 1889 (Borneo)
Elymnias penanga chelensis de Nicéville, 1890 (Assam to Tenasserim, possibly Thailand)

References

External links
"Elymnias Hübner, 1818" at Markku Savela's Lepidoptera and Some Other Life Forms

Elymnias
Butterflies described in 1851